George Boole (1815–1864) was a British mathematician and philosopher, and originator of Boolean algebra.

Boole may also refer to:
 Boole (band), an electronic music group from the United States
 Boole (crater), a lunar crater
 Boole (tree), a giant sequoia tree in Sequoia National Forest

People with the name
 Alicia Boole or Alicia Boole Stott (1860–1940), mathematician and daughter of Mary Everest and George Boole
 Mary Everest Boole (1832–1916), mathematician and wife of George Boole
 Sasha Boole (born 1988), Ukrainian singer and songwriter
 William H. Boole (1827–1896), pastor and prohibitionist in New York

See also
 Bool (disambiguation)
 Boolean (disambiguation)